Jacques Mazoyer (12 May 1910 – 11 October 2003) was a French sports shooter. He competed at the 1936, 1948, 1952 and 1956 Summer Olympics.

References

1910 births
2003 deaths
French male sport shooters
Olympic shooters of France
Shooters at the 1936 Summer Olympics
Shooters at the 1948 Summer Olympics
Shooters at the 1952 Summer Olympics
Shooters at the 1956 Summer Olympics
20th-century French people